Hans Sternberg (3 July 1878 – 13 May 1948) was a German-Jewish stage and film actor.

Selected filmography

 Peer Gynt (1919)
 Destiny (1921)
 The Fateful Day (1921)
 Tiefland (1923)
 The Stone Rider (1923)
 The Third Watch (1924)
 Athletes (1925)
 War in Peace (1925)
 The Humble Man and the Chanteuse (1925)
 A Murderous Girl (1927)
 The False Prince (1927)
 Black Forest Girl (1929)
 It's You I Have Loved (1929)
 Yes, Yes, Women Are My Weakness (1929)
 The Smuggler's Bride of Mallorca (1929)
 Marriage in Name Only (1930)
 Flachsmann the Educator (1930)
 The Fate of Renate Langen (1931)
 The Five Accursed Gentlemen (1932)
 The Black Forest Girl (1933)
 Pappi (1934)
 Playing with Fire (1934)
 The Schimeck Family (1935)
 Paul and Pauline (1936)
 The Mystery of Betty Bonn (1938)
 The Golden City (1942)
 Clothes Make the Man (1940)
 Free Land (1946)

References

External links

1878 births
1948 deaths
Jewish German male actors
German male stage actors
German male film actors
German male silent film actors
Actors from Lübeck
20th-century German male actors